Phoenicoprocta capistrata is a moth in the subfamily Arctiinae. The species was first described by Johan Christian Fabricius in 1775. It is found in the Caribbean and Brazil.

Adult females have two colour morphs, one orange reddish and the other blue. The latter was formerly considered a distinct species or variant of Phoenicoprocta capistrata.

The larvae feed on Serjania diversifolia.

References

Moths described in 1775
Euchromiina
Taxa named by Johan Christian Fabricius